Cate Tiernan (born July 24, 1961) is the pen name of Gabrielle Charbonnet, an American author.

Writing as Cate Tiernan, she is best known for her Sweep series, which follows the Wiccan adventures of a cast of high school students. The stories are sold as the Wicca series in the UK, Belgium, The Netherlands and Australia, and as White Magic (Magie Blanche) in Italy and France. Under her own name, she is chiefly known for children's books in the Princess, American Gold Gymnasts, and Disney Girls series. In 2008 and 2009, Charbonnet collaborated with author James Patterson on two "young adult" novels, Sundays at Tiffany's and Witch & Wizard.

Biography
Charbonnet was born in New Orleans, Louisiana in 1961. She began her college education at New York University studying writing and Russian language and literature, then transferred to Loyola University in New Orleans, where she graduated with a degree in Russian.  She began her career as an assistant to the head of the Juvenile Audio and Video department at Random House in New York City, where she wrote her first children's books. She also participated in the editing of  The Secret Circle by L.J. Smith during this period.

After eight years in New York, Charbonnet and her husband moved back to New Orleans, where they began a family (two children) and she embarked on her Sweep series.  While not a Wiccan herself, she asserts that she "can really relate to Wicca", and appreciates its "woman-centeredness and its essentially female identity."

After five years in New Orleans, Charbonnet moved to Durham, North Carolina, where she now lives with her husband Paul, two children, two stepsons, a poodle, and "an unfortunate number of cats."

Charbonnet has written about 75 books under her own name, her pseudonym Cate Tiernan, and miscellaneous other pen names as a ghost writer.

Selected works
Snakes Are Nothing to Sneeze At (Henry Holt & Company, 1990)
Boodil, My Dog (Henry Holt & Company, 1992)
Tutu Much Ballet (Henry Holt & Company, 1994)

The Princess Trilogy
Molly's Heart
The Room in the Attic
Home at Last
(Scholastic Inc., 1995)

American Gold Gymnasts Miniseries
Split Decision
Balancing Act
Competition Fever
The Bully Coach
(Bantam Doubleday Dell, 1996)

The Disney Girls Series
One of Us
Attack of the Beast
And Sleepy Makes Seven
A Fish Out of Water
Cinderella's Castle
One Pet Too Many
Adventure in Walt Disney World
Beauty's Revenge
Good-bye, Jasmine?
Princess of Power
The Gum Race
The Divine Miss Ariel
(Disney Press, 1998–99)

101 Dalmatians: Escape From DeVil Mansion (Disney Press, 1996)
Hercules: I Made Herc a Hero (Disney Press, 1997)
The Lion King: Just Can’t Wait to be King (Disney Press, 1998)

The Sweep series (writing as Cate Tiernan)
 Book of Shadows
 The Coven
 Blood Witch
 Dark Magick
 Awakening
 Spellbound
 The Calling
 Changeling
 Strife
 Seeker
 Origins
 Eclipse
 Reckoning
 Full Circle
 Night's Child
(PutnamPenguin, 2001–2003)

Balefire (writing as Cate Tiernan)
 A Chalice of Wind
 A Circle of Ashes
 A Feather of Stone
 A Necklace of Water
(PenguinRazorbill, 2005–2007)

Immortal Beloved (trilogy as Cate Tiernan)
 Immortal Beloved (September 2010)
 Darkness Falls (January 2012)
 Eternally Yours (2012)

Birthright (writing as Cate Tiernan)
 Darkest Fear (2014)
 Darkest Night (2016)
 Darkheart (release date not set)

References

External links
Official website

1961 births
Living people
20th-century American novelists
21st-century American novelists
American women novelists
Writers from New Orleans
20th-century American women writers
21st-century American women writers
Novelists from Louisiana
Women science fiction and fantasy writers
Pseudonymous women writers
Ghostwriters
20th-century pseudonymous writers
21st-century pseudonymous writers